Yangzhou University (YZU) is a university in Yangzhou, Jiangsu Province, China. It grew out of a merger in 1992 of six local colleges. The university offers undergraduate and graduate programs. Now 2022-23 session Yangzhou University ranked in 716 in world ranking. And 68 in Country ranking

History 
Jiangsu Province Government proceeded to merge Jiangsu Agriculture College, Yangzhou Teachers' College, Yangzhou Institute of Technology, Yangzhou Medical College, Jiangsu Water Conservancy College and Jiangsu Commerce College into a new university in 1988. It was implemented in 1992.

Schools

YZU offers its undergraduates 92 programs covering 11 disciplines, through its 26 schools:

 School of Chinese Language and Literature 
 Social Development
 Law
 Educational Science and Technology (the Teachers’ College)
 Foreign Languages
 Mathematical Science
 Physical Science and Technology
 Chemistry and Chemical Engineering
 Physical Education
 Mechanical Engineering
 Information Engineering
 Architectural Science and Engineering
 Water Conservancy and Hydraulic Engineering
 Environmental Science and Engineering
 Agriculture 
 Animal Science and Technology 
 Veterinary Science
 Bio-science and Bio-technology
 Economics
 Journalism and Communication
 Management
 Medicine
 Nursing
 Arts
 Tourism and Cuisine (Food Science)
 Guangling College (university investment)

References

External links
Suqian College 2nd dept. sponsored by 
 Yangzhou University

Universities and colleges in Jiangsu
Medical schools in China
Universities in China with English-medium medical schools